The elections for the eighth Majlis were held in the summer of 1930.

The Communist Party planned to run their own candidates, however they failed due to internal conflicts, as well as Reza Shah's substantial control over the process.

Like its predecessor, the election was "systematically controlled by the royal court".

References

1930 elections in Asia
Legislative
National Consultative Assembly elections
Electoral fraud in Iran